Iquiracetima tuberosa is a species of beetle in the family Cerambycidae. It is known from Ecuador, Bolivia, and Brazil.

References

Eupromerini
Beetles described in 1896